The New Caledonian storm petrel (Fregetta lineata) is a species of bird in the family Oceanitidae. It is an endemic breeder to New Caledonia, and has a wider nonbreeding range throughout the Coral Sea and the South Pacific, as far east as the Marquesas. 

Described in 1848, the New Caledonian storm petrel, alongside the closely related New Zealand storm petrel (F. maoriana) which shares a similar streaked coloration, was long thought to merely be an aberrant member of another storm petrel species. The recognition of the New Zealand storm petrel as a valid species prompted a reevaluation of the New Caledonian storm petrel, and it was thus revived as a distinct species in 2022. It is thought to be critically endangered, with an adult population of only 100 - 1,000 pairs.

References 

Birds described in 1848
Fregetta
Endemic birds of New Caledonia
Taxa named by Titian Peale